Marionia pustulosa is a species of sea slug, a dendronotid nudibranch, a marine gastropod mollusc in the family Tritoniidae.

Distribution
This species is reported from Australia.

References

Tritoniidae
Gastropods described in 1936